Tebbitt is a surname. Notable people with the surname include:

 Sir Alfred Tebbitt (1871–1941), French-British businessman
 Gilbert Tebbitt (1908–1993), English cricketer
 Henri Tebbitt (1854–1927), English-Australian painter

See also
 Tebbit, a surname 
 Tebbutt